is a Japanese basketball player. He competed in the men's tournament at the 1960 Summer Olympics.

References

1935 births
Living people
Japanese men's basketball players
Olympic basketball players of Japan
Basketball players at the 1960 Summer Olympics
Basketball players from Tokyo
Asian Games medalists in basketball
Asian Games silver medalists for Japan
Asian Games bronze medalists for Japan
Basketball players at the 1958 Asian Games
Medalists at the 1958 Asian Games
Basketball players at the 1962 Asian Games
Medalists at the 1962 Asian Games